Sloop Point is an unincorporated community and village in Pender County, North Carolina, United States.  It was an incorporated village, incorporated on July 1, 1996 and subsequently disincorporated on July 22, 1998, making it one of the shortest lived municipalities in the state's history, lasting just over two years.

The community is part of the Wilmington Metropolitan Statistical Area.

See also

Sloop Point (1729); historic house is one of the oldest in North Carolina

References

Unincorporated communities in North Carolina
Unincorporated communities in Pender County, North Carolina
Cape Fear (region)
Former municipalities in North Carolina
Populated places disestablished in 1998
Populated coastal places in North Carolina